The Tianping Reservoir, also known as Qingshan Lake, is a large reservoir located in the western part of Ningxiang, Hunan, China. It is the largest body of water in Ningxiang and the second largest reservoir in Ningxiang. The reservoir is the source of the Wei River.

History
In the 1970s Yang Shifang, head of the People's Government of Ningxiang, planned to build a reservoir for irrigation, flood control, electricity generation and fish farming. Due to poverty, the government mobilized the masses and used a large amount of human resources to complete the build rather than use heavy construction equipment.

References

Bibliography
 

Geography of Ningxiang
Tourist attractions in Changsha
Reservoirs in Hunan